Awards of the Montenegrin Olympic Committee are proclaimed since 1999, at the end of each calendar year, to the most successful athletes. Initially declared Young Male Athlete, Young Female Athlete, Men's Team and Woman's Team, awards for the Sportsman of the Year were introduced in 2011. The competition includes results from current Olympic sports.

Criteria for Awards
Awards are given to the athletes and teams according to their results in Olympic sports and Paralympic sports. The most valuable results are those accomplished in these competitions (in this order):

1. Olympic Games
2. World Championship
3. European Championship
4. World Cup
5. European Cup
6. Paralympic Games

If two sportspersons have identical results, award will go to athletes from individual sports instead of team sports. Exception can be taken if athlete from team sport won MVP award on Olympic Games, World Championship or European Championship. Also worldwide popularity of their sports can be taken into account, as well as maximum number of athletes from individual nation that can participate in competitions. If there are none, exceptional results in single year award will not be presented.

Sportsperson of the Year
This award is proclaimed since the introduction of awards in 2011.

Young Male Athlete of the Year
This award is introduced in 1999. So far it was awarded to 14 different athletes from 6 sports.

Young Female Athlete of the Year
This award is introduced in 1999. So far it was awarded to 14 different athletes from 8 sports.

Men's Team of the Year
This award is introduced in 1999. It was awarded to 13 different teams from 6 different sports.

Women's Team of the Year
This award is introduced in 1999. It was awarded to 5 different teams from 3 different sports.

External links
 Montenegrin Olympic Committee: List of Awardees

Sport in Montenegro
Montenegrin awards
Lists of sportspeople
Lists of award winners
1999 establishments in Montenegro
Awards established in 1999